Decarboxylated 8,5'-diferulic acid is a molecule included in the group but is not a true diferulic acid. It is found in maize bran.

See also 
 8,5'-Diferulic acid

References 

Hydroxycinnamic acid dimers
O-methylated hydroxycinnamic acids
Vinylogous carboxylic acids